Avonacanthus is an extinct genus of cartilaginous fish from the lower Carboniferous. The name is derived from the type locality of Avon Gorge, near Bristol, England.  It contains a single species, A. brevis, which was originally regarded as a species of Ctenacanthus. It is currently known only from fin spines. It is probably a cladistically basal Heslerodid.

References

Elasmobranchii
Prehistoric cartilaginous fish genera